Portugal and its OTI member station Radiotelevisão Portuguesa (RTP) was one of the founding members of the OTI Festival and debuted at the first contest in 1972 in Madrid. It participated 22 times and hosted the 1987 contest in Lisbon.

Contestants
Table key

Hosted

References 

OTI Festival